The Micro Channel Developers Association (MCDA) was a consortium of computer manufacturers that sought to consider and prioritize steps in the maturation of the Micro Channel architecture, as well as to explore better approaches to disseminating technical information about Micro Channel to third parties.

Micro Channel was a computer bus architecture introduced by International Business Machines Corporation (IBM) with their Personal System/2 family of computers in 1987. Intended as the replacement to the de facto Industry Standard Architecture IBM pioneered with the IBM PC, Micro Channel was met with backlash over IBM's exuberant licensing costs, and several computer companies, most influentially Compaq, formed a committee that developed the Extended Industry Standard Architecture (EISA) in 1988. EISA saw popularity in workstations and desktop servers in the following years. While PS/2s also enjoyed modest success in those markets, Micro Channel was seldom licensed for official clones during its first years, leading to a perception of IBM among peripheral manufacturers as a domineering patent holder. The Micro Channel Developers Association was formed in October 1990 as a response to this perception and EISA's emergence.

Membership in the MCDA carried an annual fee of $2,500. EISA manufacturers were not barred from entrance or invitation; spokespersons for MCDA contacted Compaq, lead architect of EISA, to join their consortium, as they did to EISA co-founders Olivetti  and NEC. Out of the over 800 companies developing Micro Channel products (at least those assigned numerical vendor IDs by IBM, to be read by the IBM's BIOS for MCA machines), only 14 comprised the Micro Channel Developers Association on its formation. This included IBM, Intel, Chips and Technologies, NCR Corporation, Olivetti, Apricot Computers, Western Digital, Siemens Nixdorf, AOX Inc., Reply Corporation, Core International, Cumulus Corporation, and National Software Testing Laboratories. Olivetti and NEC later joined, in November that year. MCDA grew to 92 member companies by the first quarter of 1992.

Even after IBM discontinued Micro Channel and the PS/2 in July 1995, the Micro Channel Developers Association still oversaw the development of hundreds of MCA cards and peripherals as late as May 1996, owing to its widespread use in IBM's line of RS/6000 servers and workstations. The consortium fizzled in 1997, however.

Member list
March 1992

References

External links
 
 

Technology consortia
Organizations established in 1990
Organizations disestablished in 1997
IBM PS/2